Izmukshir, formerly Zamakhshar, is the site of a ruin in the Khwarazm oasis of Turkmenistan, about 25 km. south of Daşoguz.

History 
Zamakhshar was a prominent town of medieval Khwarazm. It was the birthplace of Al-Zamakhshari, a Muslim polymath.

Site 
The ruins of the town is enclosed by a decaying wall; the southern gate survives alongside a mud-brick tower as does a gate of the northern wall. Skeletal remains are visible across the ruins. A twin-domed mausoleum adjacent to the walls is believed to be the resting place of Al-Zamakhshari — it attracts pilgrims.

References 

Populated places in Daşoguz Region
Historical regions of Iran